The men's 20 kilometres walk event at the 1998 Commonwealth Games was held on 17 September in Kuala Lumpur.

Results

References

20
1998